Canterbury United Dragons was a semi-professional football club from Christchurch, New Zealand. The team plays most of its matches at English Park in Christchurch, though they occasionally play in Nelson. The club last played in the ISPS Handa Premiership, the now folded top level of football in New Zealand.

History
The club was founded in 2002 as a conglomerate of various Christchurch area clubs, in order to form a strong team to take part in the 2002 New Zealand National Soccer League. In 2004, the league was replaced by the New Zealand Football Championship, run on a regional franchise basis, and Canterbury United became one of the eight competing teams.

In Canterbury United's first season in the New Zealand Football Championship they missed out on the playoffs by four competition points, ultimately finishing fourth. In 2007, the club rebranded themselves as the "Canterbury United Dragons" with a new logo and mascot.

Current squad

Club Officials
Coaching and Medical Staff
 Head coach: Lee Padmore 
 Assistant coach: Dan Terris 
 Goalkeeping coach: Alan Stroud
 Manager: Marcus Beaton 
 Strength and conditioning: James Deehan
 Video analysis: Jesse Rawlings
 Sports science: Blair Minton
 Performance/wellbeing: Martin Field Dodgson
 Physiotherapist: James McCormack
 Club doctor: Phil Fletcher

Managers
 Danny Halligan (1 July 2006 – 4 February 2008)
 Korouch Monsef (5 February 2008 – 30 June 2009)
 Keith Braithwaite (1 July 2009 – 30 June 2013)
 Sean Devine (1 July 2014 – 21 April 2015)
 Willy Gerdsen (1 July 2015 – 14 June 2019)
 Lee Padmore (1 July 2019 – Current)

Honours
ASB Phoenix Challenge
Winners (1): 2012

ASB Premiership Youth League
Winners (2): 2009–10, 2011–12

Statistics and records

Year-by-year history

Season summaries

Notes

References

External links
Official website
The Ultimate New Zealand Soccer Website Club database
Old New Zealand Football Championship website

Association football clubs in Christchurch
Association football clubs established in 2002
Sport in Canterbury, New Zealand
2002 establishments in New Zealand